Discrimination against non-binary people, or people who do not identify exclusively as male or female, may occur in social, legal, or medical contexts. Both cisgender and transgender people can display such prejudice, as well as members of the lesbian, gay, and bisexual communities.

Social discrimination
Genderqueerness may be considered confusing or nonexistent to people who subscribe to the binary theory of gender.

Social discrimination in the context of discrimination against non-binary people includes hate-motivated violence and excusing of such. According to a 2016 study from The Journal of Sex Research, one of the most common themes of discrimination for genderqueer people is the incorrect use of preferred gender pronouns. The study labeled this as 'nonaffirmation', and it occurs when others do not affirm one's sense of gender identity. The negative effects of misgendering are well-documented. A 2018 study published in the American Psychological Association found a positive association between misgendering and anxiety, depression, and stress. Repeated misgendering by strangers, also known as chronic misgendering, can amplify these stressors to the point where trans individuals do not want to leave their homes.

Participants within the 2016 study also reported experiencing gender policing. Gender policing is especially common in K-12 schools on a systematic level. One way in which systematic gender policing manifests in schools is through sex-segregated bathrooms. A study published in the Journal of Gay & Lesbian Services found that 23.9% of trans students surveyed, or 439 students out of 1836, were denied access to gender-appropriate bathrooms or housing at school due to being transgender or gender non-conforming. An article from the book Violence and Gender, states that this experienced violence and discrimination leads to high levels of stress. This article stated that non-binary participants are less likely to experience hate speech (24.4% vs. 50%) compared to trans men and equally as likely (24.4% vs. 24.4%) as trans women, yet genderqueer/nonbinary participants, along with trans women, are more likely than trans men individuals to be concerned about the safety of themselves and others. Non-binary individuals, when interviewed, found binary spaces such as bathrooms to be difficult to navigate, reporting visual inspections, questioning, and harassment when entering such spaces. In a 2019 paper by Douglas Schrock, interviewees reported being addressed with fear, being pressured to apologize for their appearance or androgyny, verbal confrontations, and in an extreme case, a stranger attempting to break into a stall due to suspicion. A quantitative study found that bathroom discrimination significantly increased the odds of considering or attempting suicide, with 60% of surveyed youths who were denied access to gender-appropriate bathrooms considering suicide.

Misleading interpretation of the high suicide rates of trans youths have led some to position transness as being harmful to children, or of presenting trans people as mentally ill. Whether through ignorance or malice, connecting transness solely to suicide and mental illness is a misrepresentation whose effect is to diminish the importance and life-affirming nature of trans identities in the best case and intentionally attack and deny the existence of trans people in the worst case.

United States
Of the approximately 6,450 transgender and gender-nonconforming respondents to the National Transgender Discrimination Survey (NTDS), conducted by the National Center for Transgender Equality and National Gay and Lesbian Task Force in 2008–2009, 864 (13%) chose the write-in option for gender identity, "A gender not listed here (please specify)". (The other options were "Male/man", "Female/women", and "Part time as one gender, part time as another".) Responses from these participants were analysed in the 2011 journal article "A Gender Not Listed Here: Genderqueers, Gender Rebels, and Otherwise in the National Transgender Discrimination Survey". The "a gender not listed here" (Q3GNL) individuals reported higher rates of physical (32% vs. 25%) and sexual (15% vs 9%) assault due to bias than other NTDS respondents.

Workplace discrimination

United States

According to the NTDS, almost all non-binary people had experienced discrimination in the workplace. Their findings show that being out as a non-binary person negatively affects that person's employment outcomes. Though non-binary people have higher unemployment rates than those who identify with a specified gender, masculine non-binary people who still appear male, or are not "passing as female" generally have a harder time in the work environment. 19% of Q3GNL respondents to the NTDS reported job loss due to anti-transgender bias, a smaller proportion than for other respondents (27%).

Not only does discrimination against transgender people in the workplace affect transgender employees, but it also affects the entire workplace team, distracting the victim and the perpetrator from the job itself. Transgender individuals in the U.S. often face workplace discrimination like conflicts related to their bathroom usage, backlash over transitioning genders and being misgendered by coworkers. The Center of American Progress in 2012 also found that there is also a substantial amount of public ignorance towards transgender communities, in comparison to LGB community peers. Because of that, negative psychological consequences occur as a result like mental health disparities, higher rates in attempted suicide, and anxiety in public spaces.

Military discrimination
In the United States military, physical fitness tests such as the United States Army Physical Fitness Test only have male or female standards with gender norming. The National Center for Transgender Equality has called on the US Department of Defense to "adopt policies to permit transgender service members with a non-binary gender identity to serve in a manner consistent with their gender identity."

Health discrimination

United Kingdom
A 2015 survey conducted by the Scottish Trans Alliance examined experiences of medical services among 224 non-binary individuals who had attended a gender identity clinic (GIC) in the preceding two years. When asked if they had experienced "problems getting the assistance they needed" because of their non-binary identity, 28% chose "yes", 28% "maybe", and 44% "no". Denial of treatment was reported by 13 respondents (6%), delay of treatment by 12 (5%), and lack of knowledge or understanding about their identities by 10 (5%). When asked if they had been pressured by the GIC, 43% chose "yes", 12% "unsure", and 46% "no". Respondents reported having been pressured to appear more binary (36 individuals, 17%), to change their names (19, 9%), to socially transition to fulfill the real-life experience requirement (13, 6%), or to pursue medical transition (13, 6%).

Under the law of the United Kingdom, individuals are considered by the state to be either male or female, the sex that is stated on their birth certificate. This means that non-binary gender is not recognized in UK law.

United States
A survey conducted among rural U.S. LGBT populations suggested that transgender and non-binary patients were three times more likely to find health care providers that have other LGBT patients. They were also three times more likely to drive over an hour out of the way to visit their health care provider due "to the fact that in the last year, one in ten had visited an LGBT-specific health care clinic, which are often located in urban areas."

20.4% of transgender and gender-nonconforming respondents to the NTDS reported having experienced discrimination when trying to access doctors and hospitals, 11.9% when attempting to access emergency rooms, and 4.6% when attempting to access the service of an ambulance.

Legal discrimination

Australia
The Sex Discrimination Act of 1984 did not explicitly protect non-binary people from discrimination until the Sex Discrimination Amendment (Sexual Orientation, Gender Identity and Intersex Status) Act of 2013, which prohibited any discrimination on the grounds of "gender identity" and "intersex status". This amendment also removed the use of "other" and "opposite sex" in exchange for broader terms like "different sex".

In 2014, the Australian High Court legally recognized non-binary as a category for people to identify with on legal documents. After Norrie May-Welby made a request for a third gender identity on legal documents and was eventually denied, Norrie chose to take the matter up with Australia's Human Rights Commission and their Court of Appeal. After a four-year long legal battle beginning in 2010, Norrie finally won the case. From this and the legalizing of the matter in New South Wales, the Australian Capital Territory made the decision to pass a law that recognized non-binary identities. Several other states and territories followed suit afterward.

Canada 
In 2002, the Northwest Territories was the first of Canada’s provinces to explicitly include gender identity as a protected group from discrimination under the law, followed by Manitoba in 2012. By 2015, every Canadian province and territory had included similar changes to their discrimination laws.

In 2017, Canada passed Bill C-16 which formally recognized non-binary gender people and granted them protection under the law towards discrimination on the grounds of "gender identity" and "gender expression."

United Kingdom

Non-binary is not legally recognized as a gender identity in the United Kingdom. The Gender Recognition Act 2004 allowed people to apply to the Gender Recognition Panel for a change of gender after living as the gender they wished to show on all their legal documents and being given a diagnosis of gender dysphoria by at least two health professionals. However, this only allowed for a legal change of gender from male to female or vice versa.

United States
Despite being more likely to achieve higher levels of education when compared to the general public, 90% of non-binary individuals face discrimination, often in the form of harassment in the workplace. 19% percent of self-identifying non-binary individuals reported job loss as a result of their identities. Anti-discrimination laws that prohibit discrimination specifically against non-binary individuals do not exist. However, the current proposed version of the federal Employment Non-Discrimination Act use such terms as "gender identity" and "gender expression", categories under which non-binary individuals fall due to the fact that their gender expression cannot be defined as male or female.

In 2004, Jimmie Smith was terminated from the fire department in Salem, Ohio, after revealing their diagnosis with Gender Identity Disorder and intentions to undergo a male to female transition. The district court determined the reason for termination was because of their "transsexuality" and not their gender non-conformity. The case was appealed to the Sixth Circuit, which overturned that decision and clarified to courts that under Title VII, sex discrimination was to be considered broader than only the traditional assumptions of sex.

Twelve states currently have legislation which bars discrimination based on gender identity. Despite these efforts, non-binary individuals are subject to higher rates of physical and sexual assault and police harassment than those who identify as men or women, likely due to their gender expression or presentation.

Identity documents
According to the Transgender Law Center, 70% of transgender people are not able to update their identity documents and one-third of have been harassed, assaulted or turned away when seeking basic services, and one third are not able to update their documents post-transition.

In 2016, the U.S. State Department was sued for denying a passport to Dana Zzyym, who is a veteran, an intersex person and then also identified as a non-binary person. Zzyym wrote "intersex" on their passport form instead of male or female, which were the only two available gender fields on the form. Zzyym was denied the passport, which led to LGBTQ advocacy organizations filing a lawsuit against the U.S. State Department on Zzyym's behalf. The advocacy group Lambda Legal argued for gender-neutral terms and a third option on U.S. passports, arguing that the existing passport fields violated the Due Process Clause and Equal Protection Clause of the U.S. Constitution. The State Department argued that adding additional gender fields to the passport form would prevent the agency's efforts to combat identity theft and passport fraud. The Tenth Circuit Court ruled in favor of Zzyym, the first time in U.S. history that the federal government recognized non-binary people.

California, the District of Columbia, New York City, New York State, Iowa, Vermont, Oregon and Washington State have currently removed the surgical requirement to complete a change on a birth certificate. In these states, to change the gender on a birth certificate, one must fill out a standardized form but legal or medical approvals are not required. In Washington, D.C., the applicant fills out the top half of the form and a health or social service professional must fill out the bottom half. A person may face obstacles obtaining a court order in order to make a change to documents in other states. Tennessee is the only state that has a specific statute that forbids altering the gender designation on a birth certificate due to gender surgery, while Idaho and Ohio have the same prohibition, but via court decision rather than by statute; and in Puerto Rico, a U.S. territory, a court ruled that gender markers could not be changed on identity documents under any circumstances.

In California, the Gender Recognition Act of 2017 was introduced in the State Senate in Sacramento in January 2017 and signed into law by governor Jerry Brown on October 19.  The law recognizes a third gender option known as "non-binary" which may be used on state-issued documents such as driver's licenses to more accurately reflect a person's gender. Senate bill SB179 was originally drafted by State Senators Toni Atkins and Scott Wiener.  The law also makes it easier for existing documents to be changed, by removing requirements for sworn statements by physicians and replacing it with a sworn attestation by the person seeking to make the change to their documents.  The Executive Director of Equality California commented, "It is up to an individual—not a judge or even a doctor—to define a person's gender identity."

The first two U.S. citizens to receive a court decreed non-binary gender were in Oregon and California. In Oregon, Elisa Rae Shupe was able to obtain a non-binary designation in June 2016 after a brief legal battle. Following in Shupe's footsteps, California resident Sarah Kelly Keenan was also able to legally change her gender marker to non-binary in September 2016. After both Shupe and Keenan had success with their cases, more people have been inspired to take on the legal battle of changing their gender to a non-binary marker. With the help of organizations such as the Nonbinary & Intersex Recognition Project dozens of these petitions have been granted and additional states have changed regulations to provide a third gender option on state ID, birth certificates, and/or court orders.

See also

 Anti-gender movement
 Gender polarization
 Transphobia

References

External links
 Nonbinary & Intersex Recognition Project

Discrimination against LGBT people
Non-binary gender
Transphobia